GSAT-2 was an experimental communication satellite built by the Indian Space Research Organisation (ISRO) and launched on one of the first GSLVs. The satellite was positioned at 48 deg east longitude in the geo-stationary orbit.

Payloads
GSAT-2 carried four C-band transponders, two Ku band transponders and a Mobile Satellite Service (MSS) payload operating in S-band forward link and C-band return link. Besides the communication payloads, GSAT-2 carried the following four piggyback experimental payloads:  
Total Radiation Dose Monitor (TRDM) to compare the estimated radiation doses inside the satellite with the directly measured radiation doses using a Radiation Sensitive Field Effect Transistor (RADFET) 
Surface Charge Monitor (SCM) to indicate the state of the charging environment in the vicinity of the spacecraft 
Solar X-ray Spectrometer (SOXS) to study the solar flare emission in 4 keV - 60 keV energy range using state of the art semiconductor devices and Phoswich Scintillation Detector 
Coherent Radio Beacon Experiment (CRABEX) to investigate the spatial structure, dynamic and temporal variations of Ionosphere and several aspects of equatorial electrodynamics

Weighing 1800 kg at launch, GSAT-2 incorporated a 440 newton Liquid Apogee Motor (LAM) and sixteen 22 newton Reaction Control Thrusters for raising the satellite's orbit from Geo-stationary Transfer orbit to its final geo- stationary orbit as well as for its attitude control. It carried 840 kg of propellant (monomethyl hydrazine and MON-3).

Measurements
GSAT-2 measures 9.55 m in length in its final in-orbit configuration. It is 3-axis body stabilised using Sun and Earth sensors, momentum and reaction wheels, magnetic torquers and bi-propellant thrusters. Its solar array generates 1380 W power, backed up by two 24 A·h Ni-Cd batteries.

Positioning
After its launch into Geo-synchronous transfer orbit by GSLV-D2, GSAT-2 it was taken to its final geo-stationary orbit by firing the liquid apogee motor in phases. After it reached the geo-stationary orbit, its antenna and solar Panels were deployed and the satellite was finally placed in its allocated slot of 48° east longitude.

See also

List of Indian satellites

References

External links
ISRO: GSAT-2

Communications satellites in geostationary orbit
Spacecraft launched in 2003
GSAT satellites
2003 in India
Spacecraft launched by GSLV rockets